Jacob Quistgaard (known as Quist) is a Danish guitarist and producer based in Los Angeles. Quist is best known as the lead guitarist with British singer and Roxy music frontman Bryan Ferry. He has been touring with Ferry since early 2014 and featured on his 2014 album Avonmore, with Nile Rodgers, Mark Knopfler, Johnny Marr, Flea and Marcus Miller. Other recording credits include British X-factor winners Little Mix, Stooshe and Valerie June. Quist has also performed with multi-million selling Jazz musician Jamie Cullum, bass player T.M. Stevens, Alison Moyet, Waddy Wachtel and Dutch singer Boris Titulaer. Quist is also known for his YouTube channel (Quist), which mainly features his original music, improvisations, tour vlogs and one of the largest and most popular collections of original "jam tracks" and backing tracks on the internet. The channel has over 150 million views and aside from featuring Quist, it also showcases other notable musicians, including Alice Cooper lead guitarist Nita Strauss and Pink Floyd session bass player Guy Pratt.

Biography 
Quist was born in Copenhagen, Denmark. He started playing guitar at age 6. As a young child, he studied and toured internationally with the Danish Royal Ballet. He moved to London, England as a teenager to study guitar at the Guitar Institute of Technology where he earned the title "Guitarist of the Year". He was then awarded a scholarship to study Jazz Performance at London's Royal Academy of Music. He had his professional recording debut with Danish act Franka & The Iris Band, which earned the artist a Danish Music Award. In 2011 he published his first book with Parragon, Rock Guitar, which was a worldwide, multi-language release. Quist also collaborated with fellow BIMM faculty member and session guitarist Les Davidson on a second published book "The Guitarist's Ultimate Chart Reading Book". Quist is also a regular contributor to UK magazine Guitar Techniques.  'She #Zen' the first single from Quist's instrumental album 'Trigger', had an exclusive premiere on Guitar World.

Discography

Albums

Guest appearances

References 

Year of birth missing (living people)
Living people
American male guitarists
Danish guitarists
People from Copenhagen